Edward Laurence Albert (February 20, 1951 – September 22, 2006) was an American actor. The son of actor Eddie Albert and Mexican actress Margo, he starred opposite Goldie Hawn in Butterflies Are Free (1972), a role for which he won a Golden Globe Award for New Star of the Year. He was nominated for Best Actor in a Motion Picture - Musical or Comedy. Albert starred in more than 130 films and television series, including Midway, The Greek Tycoon, Galaxy of Terror, The House Where Evil Dwells, The Yellow Rose, Falcon Crest and Power Rangers Time Force.

Early life
Edward Laurence Albert was born in Los Angeles, California, to actor Eddie Albert (1906–2005), and Mexican actress María Margarita Guadalupe Teresa Estela Bolado Castilla y O'Donnell, who went by the name Margo (1917–1985).

Albert attended Oxford University and studied psychology at the University of California, Los Angeles.

Career
Albert made his motion picture debut in the 1965 drama The Fool Killer, as a runaway orphan who crossed paths with a disturbed Civil War veteran, played by Anthony Perkins. He played opposite Goldie Hawn as a blind man in the film Butterflies Are Free (1972), for which he won a Golden Globe Award for New Star of the Year and was nominated for the Golden Globe's Best Actor – Motion Picture Musical or Comedy.

In 1973, Albert starred with Liv Ullmann in the film adaptation of the play 40 Carats. He played a U.S. Navy fighter pilot in the 1976 film Midway, portraying the son of a naval captain, played by Charlton Heston.

Albert made a guest appearance in a 1976 episode of the NBC dramatic series Gibbsville. He also was featured in the Gene Hackman suspense film The Domino Principle (1977) and the drama The Greek Tycoon (1978) with Anthony Quinn and Jacqueline Bisset. In 1981, Albert starred with Ray Walston and Erin Moran in Roger Corman's horror film Galaxy of Terror.

During the 1983–1984 television season, Albert starred as Quisto Champion on the NBC series The Yellow Rose with Sam Elliott, Cybill Shepherd and David Soul. He had a recurring role in the 1980s television series Beauty and the Beast, in which he played Elliot Burch, a New York developer who loves series heroine, Catherine Chandler, played by Linda Hamilton.

Albert played Mr. Collins, father to Wesley Collins, the Red Ranger in Power Rangers Time Force. He appeared in the 1987 film The Underachievers and voiced the superhero Daredevil in two episodes of Spider-Man: The Animated Series in the 1990s.

In 1992's The Ice Runner, Albert played an agent arrested in Russia who tries to escape from prison. In 1993, he made a guest appearance in the television show Dr. Quinn, Medicine Woman as Dr. William Burke. In Guarding Tess (1994), Albert played the son of former First Lady Tess Carlisle (Shirley MacLaine).

Personal life
Albert was an advocate of the environment and the rights of Native Americans, especially the Chumash tribe. He served on the California Coastal Commission and the California Native American Heritage Commission. The Escondido Canyon was renamed in his honor as the Edward Albert Escondido Trail and Waterfalls.

In the 1970s, Albert was engaged to actress Kate Jackson. In 1978, Albert married actress Katherine Woodville. The couple had a daughter, Thaïs Carmen Albert.

In the 2000s, Albert cared for his father, Eddie Albert, who suffered from Alzheimer's disease and died on May 26, 2005 at the age of 99.

Death
Edward Albert was diagnosed with lung cancer in 2005 and died at age 55 on September 22, 2006. He was survived by his wife, actress Katherine Woodville, and their daughter, Thaïs Carmen Albert, who is now known professionally as Thai Albert.[6][2]

Filmography

Film

Television

References

External links
 
 
 

1951 births
2006 deaths
20th-century American male actors
21st-century American male actors
American male actors of Mexican descent
American male film actors
American male television actors
American male voice actors
American people of German descent
American people of Irish descent
Deaths from lung cancer in California
Male actors from Los Angeles
New Star of the Year (Actor) Golden Globe winners
People from Pacific Palisades, California